Wayne Jacks (born February 21, 1949) is an American stock car racing driver. He was a regular in competition on the NASCAR Winston West Series during the 1990s, and has also previously competed in the NASCAR Winston Cup Series and Craftsman Truck Series, posting a best finish of 14th in Truck competition at Mesa Marin Raceway.

Career history
A native of Las Vegas, and known for competing on a shoestring budget, Jacks was a regular on the NASCAR Winston West Series, competing in 84 races between 1991 and 2003 with a best finish of third, which he achieved six times; he finished fourth in series points in 1993, his best season result. Jacks attempted eleven Winston Cup Series events, run as combination races with the Winston West Series, between 1991 and 1997; he failed to qualify for ten, including the inaugural Brickyard 400. His sole start in NASCAR's top division came in the 1993 Slick 50 500 at Phoenix International Raceway, where he finished 41st of 43 cars, completing 48 of 312 laps before retiring with an engine failure.

Jacks also competed on a part-time basis in the NASCAR Craftsman Truck Series between 1995 and 1998; in seven series starts, he posted a best finish of fourteenth at Mesa Marin Raceway in 1995. He was best known for rolling his truck at Portland Speedway during a race in 1995. He attempted to qualify for a single Busch Series race, at Las Vegas Motor Speedway in 2003, but failed to make the race.

Following his NASCAR career, Jacks continued to compete in local competition at The Bullring at Las Vegas Motor Speedway, competing in both super late models and Legends cars.

Motorsports career results

NASCAR
(key) (Bold – Pole position awarded by qualifying time. Italics – Pole position earned by points standings or practice time. * – Most laps led.)

Winston Cup Series

Busch Series

Craftsman Truck Series

References

External links
 
 

Living people
1949 births
Sportspeople from Las Vegas
Racing drivers from Las Vegas
Racing drivers from Nevada
NASCAR drivers